The Beerhouse is a speciality beer hall which opened in  Cape Town's Upper Long Street on International Beer Day, Friday 2 August 2013.

Occupying a two-storey Victorian building, the former premises of Bead Merchants of Africa, The Beerhouse comprises a long bar, inside lounge/dining area and outside terrace with historic wrought-iron balcony.

The brainchild of German entrepreneur, Randolf Jorberg, Beerhouse stocks bottled and draught beer from 13 countries, 99 bottled beers of various styles all numbered and displayed on a beer wall, and 15-20 beers on tap.

As a proponent of the local craft beer revolution, Beerhouse has a strong bias towards supporting South African microbreweries of which the Western Cape boasts over 100.  In addition to clear, weiss and experimental brews, traditional African beer, Umqombothi, made from corn, sorghum malt and yeast is available.

The Beerhouse carries through its theme with beer keg wash-basins in the wash-rooms and is featured in Thrillist's "21 Best Beer Bars in the World"

Brew Food Fusion
Beerhouse pioneered its Brew Food Fusion menu in August 2017 in association with TV's The Ultimate Braai Master Winner Piet Marais. The menu centres around meat prepared using beer and in-house hardwood smokers.

Branches

Beerhouse Fourways
A second Beerhouse in Fourways, Johannesburg, opened in July 2014.<ref name="Beerhouse Fourways".

Beerhouse Centurion
A third Beerhouse in Centurion closed permanently after just a short time

Expansion
The Beerhouse aims to open 20 Beerhouse outlets across South Africa by 2020.

See also
 Beer in South Africa
 Beer in Africa
 Beer sommelier
 Food pairing

References

External links
 Official website

Beer in South Africa
Food and drink companies based in Cape Town
German-South African culture
South African brands
Beer culture
Bars (establishments)
Pubs
Beer gardens
Restaurants in South Africa
Restaurants established in 2013
South African companies established in 2013